Hammigi  is a village in the Mundargi taluk of Gadag district in the Indian state of Karnataka. Hammigi is located south to district headquarters Gadag and Taluka headquarters Mundargi

Importance
Hammigi is famous for the ancient Hammigi Fort located in the village. As of now a project called singatalore Yetha neeravari (Singatalur Lift irrigation Project ) also called "Huli Guddada Dam" locally, has been constructed in hammigi village and 0.5 km away from village to River Tungabhadra. An ancient temple is located and called basavanna temple. One famous stone art temple called majjar temple. This village is covered by hills where electricity is generated through wind mills.

There is Veerabadreswara Kshetra singatalur(Across river village "Honnur") that is on the way between Singatalur and Hammigi. This place is of religious importance for God Veerabhadreshwar.
Thousands of people visit this temple every year on Jatra Which happens Every year of March . This Temple  is situated On banks of river Tungabhadra.

Demographics
 India census, Hammigi had a population of 4,068 with 2,151  males and 1,917 females and 793 households.

See also
Mundargi
Gadag
Koppal
Hoovina Hadagali
Honnur

References

External links
 http://www.gadag.nic.in 

Villages in Gadag district